Shorterville is an unincorporated community in Henry County, Alabama, United States. Shorterville has a post office with ZIP code 36373.

Gallery
Below are photographs taken in Shorterville as part of the Historic American Buildings Survey:

References

Unincorporated communities in Henry County, Alabama
Unincorporated communities in Alabama
Alabama populated places on the Chattahoochee River